The Federal Drug Control Service of the Russian Federation or FSKN (in Russian: Федеральная служба Российской Федерации по контролю за оборотом наркотиков, ФСКН России) was a federal law enforcement agency of executive authority authorized to combat illicit drug trafficking. It was responsible for drafting state policy, legal regulation, control and monitoring in combating the trafficking of drugs, psychotropic substances, and their precursors. It was commonly known as The Drugs Police (Наркополиция).

The FSKN shared concurrent jurisdiction with the Federal Security Service of Russia and the Ministry of Internal Affairs (MVD). The FSKN had sole responsibility for coordinating and pursuing Russian drug investigations abroad, especially in Central Asia.

On 5 April 2016, the Federal Drug Control Service was dissolved, and its functions and authorities were transferred to Main Drugs Control Directorate of the Ministry of Internal Affairs.

History
The first Anti-Drugs Independent Russian Agency was launched on 24 September 2002 under the name "The State Committee for Combat the Illicit Trafficking in Narcotic Drugs and Psychotropic Substances under the Ministry of Internal Affairs of the Russian Federation" (UNON MVD).

On 11 March 2003, the agency was transformed into the State Committee of Russian Federation to Monitor the Trafficking of Narcotic Drugs and Psychotropic Substances (GOSNARCOCONTROL). That organization eventually became the Federal Drug Control Service of Russia. Viktor Cherkesov was appointed as the chairman of the committee. With around 40,000 employees and a budget of over US$800,000, the Committee surpassed the budget and staff numbers of the abolished Federal Tax Police Service of the Russian Federation. The committee began its operations on 1 July 2003.

On 6 June 2003, the Duma approved the Regulations on the State Committee of Russian Federation for the control of narcotic drugs and psychotropic substances. On 9 March 2004, The Russian Federal Drug Control Service was renamed to the Federal Service of the Russian Federation for the control of narcotic drugs and psychotropic substances and on 28 July 2004, was renamed the Russian Federal Service for Drug Control. On 12 May 2008, the President of Russia dismissed Viktor Cherkesov as Director of the Russian Federal Drug Control Service. On 15 May 2008, President Dmitry Medvedev appointed the former KGB general Viktor Ivanov as a Director of the Russian Federal Drug Control Service.

On 5 April 2016, the FSKN was replaced by the Main Directorate for Drugs Control of the Ministry of Internal Affairs of the Russian Federation.

Structure
State Anti-Drugs Committee (Государственный антинаркотический комитет)
Federal Drug Control Service
Directorate for Analytical Coordination
Operative Directorate
Operation and Search Directorate
Directorate for coordination of Operative Activities
Directorate for combating against Drug Crimes in Transportation
Directorate for combating against illegal activities in narcotics sphere
Directorate for combating against Money laundering
Department for International Cooperation
Investigative Department
Department for Special Technic Activities
 Department for Internal Security
 Directorate for Special Communications (Wiretapping and eavesdropping)
Directorate for Special Purpose (Spetsnaz Directorate)
"Grom" Unit («Гром») – A special unit designed to fight against illegal drugs crimes and Narco-Mafia
Medical Directorate
Directorate for Technic Support

Tasks and missions

The main tasks of Russian Federal Drug Control Service were: 
monitoring the trafficking of drugs;
detection, prevention, suppression, detection and preliminary investigation of crimes attributed to the investigative jurisdiction of Federal Drug Control Service of Russia;
coordination of enforcement authorities to combat drug trafficking;
establishment and maintenance of a unified data bank on issues related to drug trafficking, as well as to combat their illegal trafficking.

Day of Drug Control Authorities
On 16 February 2008, a Decree of Russian President Vladimir Putin announced an official professional holiday on 11 March – the Day of Drug Control Authorities.

Criticism
Criticism of the Federal Drug Control Service of Russia stemmed from legal concerns. For example, in 2004, the use of the analgesic medication ketamine was explicitly forbidden for use in veterinary clinics after it had been scheduled as a drug of abuse. Veterinarians, to alleviate the suffering of animals, broke the law as a result of a conflict between the legal and moral implications. The most "sensational" case was the process of Alexandra Duque.

The Federal Drug Control Service also drew criticism for allegedly rigging the results of substance inspections (for example, identifying UR-144 as JWH-018 and finding drugs that were never there), improper scheduling (such as qualifying Modafinil as a cocaine substitute) and using very vague and unspecific drug analog laws.

Directors

See also

Main Directorate for Drugs Control, successor
DEA, the U.S. counterpart
United Nations Office on Drugs and Crime
International Narcotics Control Caucus
International Narcotics Control Board
Anti-Narcotics Force

In popular culture
Two films were created by the Russian government about the FSKN:
 Tiski (2007) by Valery Todorovsky, starring Maksim Matveev, Fyodor Bondarchuk and Aleksey Serebryakov
 Antidur (2007) by Vladimir Shchegolkov ; starring Vladimir Turchinsky and Dmitry Dyuzhev

References

Further reading

English
 International – Russian Federation // Basic Data // Laws and Policies – Research on HIV and IDU in Russia
 Louise Shelley, The Drug Trade in Contemporary Russia, 2006
 "Atmospheric Pressure" – Russian Drug Policy as a Driver for Violations of the UN Convention against Torture
 Research of the ICSDP on Russian drugs atmosphere

Russian
 Специализированным подразделениям по борьбе с незаконным оборотом наркотиков МВД России – 19 лет, Отдел общественных связей – Департамент уголовного розыска // МВД РФ
 Алексей Мухин. Путеводитель по спецслужбам России. Центр политической информации, 2006.
 Владимир Овчинский. Правовые основы деятельности органов Госнаркоконтроля: сборник документов. Инфра-М, 2004
 Бахаудин Батирович Тангиев, Наркотизация России – угроза национальной безопасности, Северно-Западное управление внутренных дел на транспорте МВД России, 2004 – 155 pages
 Г. М Миньковский. Наркотизм: профилактика и стратегия борьбы, Институт научной информации по общественным наукам (Российская академия наук), Главный информационный центр МВД России, 1999.

External links 

 FSKN official website
 Official YouTube channel

Drug control law enforcement agencies
Defunct government agencies of Russia
Specialist law enforcement agencies of Russia
Drug policy of Russia
Ministry of Internal Affairs (Russia)